The British conquest of Egypt (1882), also known as Anglo-Egyptian War, occurred in 1882 between Egyptian and Sudanese forces under Ahmed ‘Urabi and the United Kingdom. It ended a nationalist uprising against the Khedive Tewfik Pasha. It established firm British influence over Egypt  at the expense of the Egyptians, the French, and the Ottoman Empire, whose already weak authority became nominal.

Background

In 1881, an Egyptian army officer, Ahmed ‘Urabi (then known in English as Arabi Pasha), mutinied and initiated a coup against Tewfik Pasha, the Khedive of Egypt and Sudan, because of grievances over disparities in pay between Egyptians and Europeans, as well as other concerns. In January 1882 the British and French governments sent a "Joint Note" to the Egyptian government, declaring their recognition of the Khedive's authority. On 20 May, British and French warships arrived off the coast of Alexandria. On 11 June, an anti-Christian riot occurred in Alexandria that killed 50 Europeans. Colonel ‘Urabi ordered his forces to put down the riot, but Europeans fled the city and ‘Urabi's army began fortifying the town. The French fleet was recalled to France. A British ultimatum  was rejected and its warships began a -hour bombardment of Alexandria on 11 July.

Reasons for the invasion
The reasons why the British government sent a fleet of ships to the coast of Alexandria is a point of historical debate. In their 1961 essay Africa and the Victorians, Ronald Robinson and John Gallagher argue that the British invasion was ordered in order to quell the perceived anarchy of the ‘Urabi Revolt, as well as to protect British control over the Suez Canal in order to maintain its shipping route to the Indian Ocean.

A.G. Hopkins rejected Robinson and Gallagher's argument, citing original documents to claim that there was no perceived danger to the Suez Canal from the ‘Urabi movement, and that ‘Urabi and his forces were not chaotic "anarchists", but rather maintained law and order. He alternatively argues that British Prime Minister William Gladstone's cabinet was motivated by protecting the interests of British bondholders with investments in Egypt as well as by pursuit of domestic political popularity. Hopkins cites the British investments in Egypt that grew massively leading into the 1880s, partially as a result of the Khedive's debt from construction of the Suez Canal, as well as the close links that existed between the British government and the economic sector. He writes that Britain's economic interests occurred simultaneously with a desire within one element of the ruling Liberal Party for a militant foreign policy in order to gain the domestic political popularity that enabled it to compete with the Conservative Party. Hopkins cites a letter from Edward Malet, the British consul general in Egypt at the time, to a member of the Gladstone Cabinet offering his congratulations on the invasion: "You have fought the battle of all Christendom and history will acknowledge it. May I also venture to say that it has given the Liberal Party a new lease of popularity and power."

John Galbraith and Afaf Lutfi al-Sayyid-Marsot make a similar argument to Hopkins, though their argument focuses on how individuals within the British government bureaucracy used their positions to make the invasion appear as a more favourable option. First, they describe a plot by Edward Malet in which he portrayed the Egyptian government as unstable to his superiors in the cabinet. On Galbraith and al-Sayyid-Marsot's reading, Malet naïvely expected he could convince the British to intimidate Egypt with a show of force without considering a full invasion or occupation as a possibility. They also dwell on Admiral Beauchamp Seymour, who, they claim, hastened the start of the bombardment by exaggerating the danger posed to his ships by ‘Urabi's forces in his telegrams back to the British government.

Course of the war

British bombardment

The British fleet bombarded Alexandria from 11 to 13 July and then occupied it with marines. The British did not lose a single ship, but much of the city was destroyed by fires caused by explosive shells and by ‘Urabists seeking to ruin the city that the British were taking over. Tewfik Pasha, who had moved his court to Alexandria during the unrest, declared ‘Urabi a rebel and formally deposed him from his positions within the government.

‘Urabi's response
‘Urabi then reacted by obtaining a fatwa from Al Azhar shaykhs which condemned Tewfik as a traitor to both his country and religion, absolving those who fought against him. ‘Urabi also declared war on the United Kingdom and initiated conscription.

British order of battle

The British army launched a probing attack at Kafr El Dawwar in an attempt to see if it was possible to reach Cairo through Alexandria. Afterwards, they determined it would not be possible to reach Cairo from this direction as Egyptian defences were too strong. In August, a British army of over 40,000, commanded by Garnet Wolseley, invaded the Suez Canal Zone. He was authorised to destroy 'Urabi's forces and clear the country of all other rebels.

The engineer troops had left England for Egypt in July and August 1882. The engineers included pontoon, railway and telegraph troops.

Wolseley saw the campaign as a logistical challenge as he did not believe the Egyptians would put up much resistance.

Order of battle of the British Expeditionary Force
 Commander: Lieutenant General Sir Garnet Wolseley
 Chief of Staff: Lieutenant General Sir John Adye

1st Division (Lt Gen GHS Willis)
1st Brigade (Maj Gen HRH The Duke of Connaught)
 2nd Battalion, Grenadier Guards
 2nd Battalion, Coldstream Guards
 1st Battalion, Scots Guards
2nd Brigade (Maj Gen Gerald Graham VC)
 1st Battalion, The Buffs (East Kent Regiment)
 1st Battalion, Royal Irish Fusiliers (Princess Victoria's)
 2nd Battalion, Royal Irish Fusiliers (Princess Victoria's)
 2nd Battalion, York and Lancaster Regiment
Divisional Troops
 19th Hussars (2 Sqns)
 2nd Battalion, Duke of Cornwall's Light Infantry
 A Battery, 1st Field Brigade, Royal Artillery
 D Battery, 1st Field Brigade, Royal Artillery
 24 Field Company, Royal Engineers
 12 Company, Army Commissariat and Transport Corps
 1 Bearer Company, Army Hospital Corps (Half)
 3 Field Hospital, Army Hospital Corps
2nd Division (Lt Gen Sir Edward Hamley)
3rd (Highland) Infantry Brigade (Maj Gen Sir Archibald Alison)
 2nd Battalion, Highland Light Infantry
 1st Battalion, Black Watch (Royal Highlanders)
 1st Battalion, Cameron Highlanders
 1st Battalion, Gordon Highlanders
4th Brigade (Maj Gen Sir Evelyn Wood VC)
 1st Battalion, The Royal Sussex Regiment
 1st Battalion, Royal Berkshire Regiment (Princess Charlotte's)
 1st Battalion, The South Staffordshire Regiment
 1st Battalion, The King's Shropshire Light Infantry
Divisional Troops
 19th Hussars (2 Sqns)
 3rd Battalion, The King's Royal Rifle Corps
 I Battery, 2nd Field Brigade, Royal Artillery
 N Battery, 2nd Field Brigade, Royal Artillery
 26 Field Company, Royal Engineers
 11 Company, Army Commissariat and Transport Corps
 2 Bearer Company, Army Hospital Corps (Half)
 4 Field Hospital, Army Hospital Corps
 5 Field Hospital, Army Hospital Corps
Indian Contingent (Maj Gen Sir Herbert Macpherson VC)
 1st Battalion, Manchester Regiment
 1st Battalion, Seaforth Highlanders
 7th Bengal Infantry
 20th Punjab Infantry
 29th Baluch Infantry
 7 (Mountain) Battery, Northern Division, Royal Garrison Artillery
 (plus their own Commissariat, Engineers etc.)

Cavalry Division (Maj Gen Drury Curzon Drury Lowe)
1st (Heavy) Cavalry Brigade (Brig Gen Sir Baker Creed Russell)
 Household Cavalry Composite Regiment (1 Sqn each from the 1st Life Guards, 2nd Life Guards and Royal Horse Guards)
 4th Dragoon Guards
 7th Dragoon Guards
2nd (Bengal) Cavalry Brigade (Brig Gen H. C. Wilkinson)
 2nd Bengal Cavalry
 6th Bengal Cavalry
 13th Bengal Lancers
Division Troops
 N Battery, A Horse Brigade, Royal Horse Artillery
 Mounted Infantry Battalion (formed from Mounted Coys of line infantry battalions)
 17 Company, Army Commissariat and Transport
 6 Field Hospital, Army Hospital Corps
Army Troops
 Naval Brigade
 Battalion, Royal Marine Light Infantry
 G Battery, B Horse Brigade, Royal Horse Artillery
 F Battery, 1st Field Brigade, Royal Field Artillery
 H Battery, 1st Field Brigade, RFA
 C Battery, 3rd Field Brigade, RFA
 J Battery, 3rd Field Brigade, RFA
" T Battery, 3rd Field Brigade, RFA
 Royal Marine Artillery
 1 Battery, London Division, Royal Garrison Artillery
 4 Battery, London Division, RGA
 5 Battery, London Division, RGA
 5 Battery, Scottish Division, RGA
 6 Battery, Scottish Division, RGA
Army Train
 A (Bridging) Troop, Royal Engineers
 C (Telegraph) Troop, RE
 Railway Troop, RE
 8 Field Company, RE
 17 Field Company, RE
 18 Field Company, RE
 A Company, Queen's Own Madras Sappers and Miners
 I Company, QOMS&M
 8 Company, Army Commissariat and Transport Corps
 15 Company, ACT Corps
 Auxiliary Company, ACT Corps
 2 Bearer Company, Army Hospital Corps
 1 Field Hospital, AHC
 3 Field Hospital, AHC
 7 Field Hospital, AHC
 8 Field Hospital, AHC
 Army Post Office Corps (M Company 49th Middlesex Rifle Volunteers)

Battle of Kafr El Dawwar

This battle took place on 5 August 1882 between an Egyptian army, headed by Ahmed 'Urabi, and British forces headed by Sir Archibald Alison. Seeking to ascertain the strength of the Egyptian's Kafr El Dawwar position, and to test local rumours that the Egyptians were retreating, Alison ordered a probing attack on the evening of the 5th. This action was reported by 'Urabi as a battle, and Cairo was full of the news that the advancing British had been repulsed; however most historians describe the action merely as a reconnaissance in force which was never intended as a serious assault on the Egyptian lines. Regardless, the result was that the British abandoned any hope they may have had of reaching Cairo from the north, and shifted their base of operations to Ismailia instead.

Wolseley arrived at Alexandria on 15 August and immediately began to organize the movement of troops through the Suez Canal to Ismailia. This was quickly accomplished; Ismailia was occupied on 20 August without resistance.

Battle of Tell El Kebir

Ismailia was quickly reinforced with 9,000 troops, with the engineers put to work repairing the railway line from Suez. A small force was pushed along the Sweet Water Canal to the Kassassin lock arriving on 26 August. There they met the enemy. Heavily outnumbered the two battalions with 4 guns held their ground until some heavy cavalry arrived when the force went onto the offensive, forcing ‘Urabi to fall back  with heavy casualties.

The main body of the army started to move up to Kassassin and planning for the battle at Tell El Kebir was undertaken. Skirmishing took place but did not interfere with the build up. On 12 September all was ready and during that night the army marched to battle.

13 September – ‘Urabi redeployed to defend Cairo against Wolseley. His main force dug in at Tell El Kebir, north of the railway and the Sweet Water Canal, both of which linked Cairo to Ismailia on the canal. The defences were hastily prepared as there was little time to arrange them. ‘Urabi's forces possessed 60 pieces of artillery and breech loading rifles. Wolseley made several personal reconnaissances, and determined that the Egyptians did not man outposts in front of their main defences at night, which made it possible for an attacking force to approach the defences under cover of darkness. Wolseley sent his force to approach the position by night and attacked frontally at dawn.

Continuing the advance, the defending troops were hampered by the smoke from their weapons blocking their vision of the advancing British. The three battalions arrived in the enemy trenches all together and with little loss, resulting in a decisive victory for the British.

Officially losing only 57 troops while killing approximately two thousand Egyptians, the British army had more casualties due to heatstroke than enemy action. The ‘Urabi forces were routed, and British cavalry pursued them and captured Cairo, which was undefended.

Power was then restored to the Khedive, the war was at an end and the majority of the British army went to Alexandria and took ship for home, leaving, from November, just an army of occupation.

Lieutenant William Mordaunt Marsh Edwards was awarded a Victoria Cross for his gallantry during the battle.

British military innovations

Railway 
During the build up to the battle at Tell El Kebir the specially raised 8th Railway Company RE operated trains carrying stores and troops, as well as repairing track. On the day of the battle they ran a train into Tell El Kebir station between 8 and 9 am (13 September) and "found it completely blocked with trains, full of the enemy's ammunition: the line strewn with dead and wounded, and our own soldiers swarming over the place almost mad for want of water" (extract from Captain Sidney Smith's diary). Once the station was cleared they began to ferry the wounded, prisoners and troops with stores to other destinations.

Telegraph 
In the wake of the advancing columns, telegraph lines were laid on either side of the Sweet Water canal. At 2 am (13 September) Wolseley successfully sent a message to the Major General Sir H. Macpherson VC on the extreme left with the Indian Contingent and the Naval Brigade. At Tell El Kebir a field telegraph office was established in a saloon carriage, which Arabi Pasha had travelled in the day before. At 8:30 am (13 September) after the victory at the battle of Tell El Kebir, Wolseley used the telegram to send messages of his victory to Queen Victoria; he received a reply from her at 9.15 am the same day. Once they had got connected to the permanent line the Section also worked the Theiber sounder and the telephone.

Army Post Office Corps 
The forerunners of Royal Engineers (Postal Section) made their debut on this campaign. They were specially raised from the 24th Middlesex Rifle Volunteers (Post Office Rifles) and for the first time in British military history, post office clerks trained as soldiers, provided a dedicated postal service to an army in the field. During the battle of Kassassin they became the first Volunteers ever to come under enemy fire.

Aftermath

‘Urabi's trial
Prime Minister Gladstone initially sought to put ‘Urabi on trial and execute him, portraying him as "a self-seeking tyrant whose oppression of the Egyptian people still left him enough time, in his capacity as a latter-day Saladin, to massacre Christians." After glancing through his captured diaries and various other evidence, there was little with which to "demonize" ‘Urabi in a public trial. His charges were down-graded, after which he admitted to rebellion and was sent into exile.

British occupation

British troops then occupied Egypt until the Anglo-Egyptian Treaty of 1922 and Anglo-Egyptian treaty of 1936, giving gradual control back to the government of Egypt.

Hopkins argues that Britain continued its occupation of Egypt after 1882 in order to guarantee British investments: "Britain had important interests to defend in Egypt and she was prepared to withdraw only if conditions guaranteeing the security of those interests were met—and they never were." Consistent with this view, investment in Egypt increased during the British occupation, interest rates fell, and bond prices rose.

See also
 Egypt Medal
 Khedive's Star
 List of conflicts in the Near East

References

Further reading
 Barthorp, Michael. The British Army on Campaign: vol 4: 1882–1902 (Osprey Publishing, 1988).
 Halvorson, D. "Prestige, prudence and public opinion in the 1882 British occupation of Egypt." Australian Journal of Politics and History (2010) 56#3, 423–440. online free
 Hopkins, Anthony G. "The Victorians and Africa: a reconsideration of the occupation of Egypt, 1882." Journal of African History 27.2 (1986): 363–391.
 Langer, William L.  European alliances and alignments, 1871–1890 (1950) pp 251–80.
 Mowat, R.C. "From Liberalism to Imperialism: The Case of Egypt 1875–1887", Historical Journal, Vol 16, No.1 (Mar., 1973), pp. 109–124. online
 Mulligan, William. "Decisions for Empire: Revisiting the 1882 Occupation of Egypt." English Historical Review 135.572 (2020): 94–126.
 Newsinger, John. "Liberal Imperialism and the Occupation of Egypt in 1882." Race & Class 49.3 (2008): 54–75.
 Reid, Donald Malcolm. "The 'Urabi revolution and the British conquest, 1879–1882", in M.W. Daly, ed., The Cambridge History of Egypt, vol. 2: Modern Egypt, from 1517 to the end of the twentieth century (1998) pp. 217=238.
 Robinson, Ronald, and John Gallagher. Africa and the Victorians: The Climax of Imperialism (1961) pp 76–159. online
  al-Sayid-Marsot, A. "The Occupation of Egypt", in A. Porter (ed), The Oxford History of the British Empire: The Nineteenth Century: Volume III (Oxford, 1999)
 Schölch, Alexander. "The ‘Men on the Spot’ and the English Occupation of Egypt in 1882." Historical Journal 19.3 (1976): 773–785.
 Thomas, Martin, and Richard Toye. "Arguing about intervention: a comparison of British and French rhetoric surrounding the 1882 and 1956 invasions of Egypt." Historical Journal 58.4 (2015): 1081–1113.

Primary sources
 Cromer, Earl of. Modern Egypt (2 vol 1908) online free  1220pp, by a senior British official
 Malet, Edward.  Egypt, 1879–1883 (London, 1909), by a senior British official online

External links

 Old Mersey Times.  "The Bombardment of Alexandria" (1882)
 Autobiography of Sir John Stokes
 

'Urabi revolt
Egypt–United Kingdom relations
Anglo 1882
Egyptian 1882
Invasions
Conflicts in 1882
1882 in Egypt
1882 in the United Kingdom
19th-century military history of the United Kingdom
British colonisation in Africa
 
Invasions of Egypt
African resistance to colonialism